Susan Hinckley Greenough Bradley (1851–1929) was an American painter known especially for her watercolor landscapes and portrait drawings.

Early years
Bradley was born Susan Hinckley in Boston, Massachusetts, the daughter of Samuel Lyman Hinckley and Anne Cutler (née Parker) Hinckley (1813–1898).  Her paternal grandparents were Jonathan Huntington Lyman and Sophia (née Hinckley) Lyman.  Her maternal grandparents were Samuel Dunn Parker and Elizabeth (née Mason) Parker, the daughter of U.S. Senator Jonathan Mason. Her aunt, Sally Outram Lyman, was married to agricultural writer Richard Lamb Allen.  Her younger brother was painter Robert Cutler Hinckley.

She began her art studies in Boston at the School of the Museum of Fine Arts, studying with Frederic Crowninshield, and at the Pennsylvania Academy of the Fine Arts in Philadelphia, as well as with Abbott Thayer, William Merritt Chase, John Henry Twachtman, and Edward Darley Boit in Rome.

Work
Her paintings can be found in Harvard University, Harvard Art Museum, Fogg Museum, in Cambridge, Massachusetts, at Smith College Museum of Art, Northampton, Massachusetts, and in the Museum of Fine Arts, Boston, as well as in numbers private collections.

She exhibited a painting, Mount Monadnock, at the 1893 World’s Columbian Exposition.

She married a minister, Leverett Bradley, in 1879 and served as the editor of his Civil War memoir, Leverett Bradley: A Soldier-Boy’s Letters, 1862-1865, A Man’s Work in the Ministry, privately printed in Boston, 1905. She died in Boston in 1929.

References

External links
 

1851 births
1929 deaths
19th-century American painters
20th-century American painters
American women painters
19th-century American women artists
20th-century American women artists
School of the Museum of Fine Arts at Tufts alumni
Pennsylvania Academy of the Fine Arts alumni
Artists from Boston
Painters from Massachusetts